The Play-offs of the 1996 Fed Cup Asia/Oceania Zone Group II were the final stages of the Group II Zonal Competition involving teams from Asia and Oceania. Those that qualified for this stage placed first and second in their respective pools.

The four teams were then paired up the team from a different placing of the other group for a play-off tie, with the winners being promoted to Group I in 1997.

New Zealand vs. Uzbekistan

  advanced to Group I in 1997, where they placed fifth overall.

Chinese Taipei vs. Singapore

  advanced to Group I in 1997, where they placed second overall.

See also
Fed Cup structure

References

External links
 Fed Cup website

1996 Fed Cup Asia/Oceania Zone